Birch Spinney and Mawsley Marsh is a  biological Site of Special Scientific Interest north-west of Broughton in Northamptonshire.

Birch Spinney is a rare type of ash-maple woodland partly on peat. Mawsley Marsh is described by Natural England as "one of the finest remaining Northamptonshire marshes", with flora including blunt-flowered rush, jointed rush and water horsetail. There is also a stretch of a dismantled railway line.

There is no access to the site but a footpath from Great Cransley (not Mawsley) runs along the boundary of Mawsley Marsh.

References

Sites of Special Scientific Interest in Northamptonshire